Leith Cove is a cove in the northeast part of Paradise Harbor, along the west coast of Graham Land, Antarctica. It was probably named by whalers operating in this vicinity, as Leith, Scotland, was the home of Salvesen and Company, whalers.

References

Coves of Graham Land
Danco Coast